Tallard is a commune in the Hautes-Alpes department in the Provence-Alpes-Côte d'Azur region in southeastern France.

Location
The motorway A51 ends just to the south, near the village of La Saulce.

Mayor
Jean-Michel Arnaud (UDF) was mayor of Tallard from 2001 to 2020. Daniel Borel was elected mayor in November 2020.

Population
Inhabitants are called Tallardiens.

Tour de France
In 2007, Tallard was the start for the  stage 10 of the Tour de France to Marseille.

See also
Communes of the Hautes-Alpes department

References

External links
 Tallard dans le Tour de France 

Communes of Hautes-Alpes
Hautes-Alpes communes articles needing translation from French Wikipedia